This List of SDG targets and indicators provides a complete overview of all the targets and indicators for the 17 Sustainable Development Goals. The global indicator framework for Sustainable Development Goals was developed by the Inter-Agency and Expert Group on SDG Indicators (IAEG-SDGs) and agreed upon at the 48th session of the United Nations Statistical Commission held in March 2017. The official indicator list below includes all the refinements made .

Background

Targets and indicators for each SDG 

This table is the global indicator framework for the Sustainable Development Goals and targets of the 2030 Agenda for Sustainable Development The footnotes are updates from the indicator framework in 2020. The official indicator list below includes all updates until the 51st session Statistical Commission in March 2020. Between 15 October 2018 and 17 April 2020, a range of changes have been made to the indicators. Those are not yet reflected in the table below.

Sustainable Development Goal indicators should be disaggregated, where relevant, by income, sex, age, race, ethnicity, migratory status, disability and geographic location, or other characteristics, in accordance with the Fundamental Principles of Official Statistics.

Goal 1: End poverty in all its forms everywhere

Goal 2: End hunger, achieve food security and improved nutrition and promote sustainable agriculture

Goal 3: Ensure healthy lives and promote well-being for all at all ages

Goal 4: Ensure inclusive and equitable quality education and promote lifelong learning opportunities for all

Goal 5: Achieve gender equality and empower all women and girls

Goal 6: Ensure availability and sustainable management of water and sanitation for all

Goal 7: Ensure access to affordable, reliable, sustainable and modern energy for all

Goal 8: Promote sustained, inclusive and sustainable economic growth, full and productive employment and decent work for all

Goal 9: Build resilient infrastructure, promote inclusive and sustainable industrialization and foster innovation

Goal 10: Reduce inequality within and among countries

Goal 11: Make cities and human settlements inclusive, safe, resilient and sustainable

Goal 12: Ensure sustainable consumption and production patterns

Goal 13: Take urgent action to combat climate change and its impacts

Goal 14: Conserve and sustainably use the oceans, seas and marine resources for sustainable development

Goal 15: Protect, restore and promote sustainable use of terrestrial ecosystems, sustainably manage forests, combat desertification, and halt and reverse land degradation and halt biodiversity loss

Goal 16: Promote peaceful and inclusive societies for sustainable development, provide access to justice for all and build effective, accountable and inclusive institutions at all levels

Goal 17: Strengthen the means of implementation and revitalize the Global Partnership for Sustainable Development

Repeat indicators 
Indicators in the global indicator framework that repeat are the following:

 7.b.1/12.a.1
 8.4.1/12.2.1
 8.4.2/12.2.2
 10.3.1/16.b.1
 10.6.1/16.8.1
 13.2.1/13.b.1 (with a slight amendment)
 15.7.1/15.c.1
 15.a.1/15.b.1
 1.5.1/11.5.1/13.1.1
 1.5.3/11.b.1/13.1.2
 1.5.4/11.b.2/13.1.3
 4.7.1/12.8.1/13.3.1

Notes 

fb xcbcbxc

References 

Sustainable development
Sustainable Development Goals